Putování slepého hada za pravdou is a Czech novel, written by Ladislav Klíma. It was first published in 1917.

1917 Czech novels